The 42nd edition of the annual Hypo-Meeting took place on May 28 and May 29, 2016 in Götzis, Austria. The track and field competition, featuring a men's decathlon and a women's heptathlon event was part of the 2016 IAAF World Combined Events Challenge. Damian Warner and Brianne Theisen-Eaton led the men's and women's competition, respectively, after the first day. Warner (8523 points) and Theisen-Eaton (6765 points) were the winners of the events overall.

Men's Decathlon

Schedule 

May 28

May 29

Records

Results

100 metres

Long jump

Shot put

High jump

400 metres

110 metres hurdles

Discus throw

Pole vault

Javelin throw

1500 metres

References 

 Results
 Women's Event by Event Heptathlon Scores
 Men's Event by Event Decathlon Scores

2011
Hypo-Meeting
Hypo-Meeting